Repetin is an extracellular matrix protein expressed in the epidermis. In humans it is encoded by the RPTN gene. Repetin is part of the S100 fused-type protein family and contains an EF hand structural domain.

It functions in the cornified cell envelope formation. It is a multifunctional epidermal matrix protein. RPTN reversibly binds calcium.

RPTN is 5,634 bases long. It starts 152,126,071 base pairs from pter. It ends 152,131,704 base pairs from pter. It has a minus strand orientation.

RPTN is one of the genes that differ between present-day humans and Neanderthals.
RPTN helps protect skin cells, and since the Neanderthals were missing this protein, the Neanderthals were better adapted to the cold, but less so to disease.

References 

S100 fused-type proteins